, also known as The Golden Victory, is an English contract law case, concerning the measure of damages for breach of contract.

Facts
Golden Strait Corp chartered a ship to Nippon Yusen Kubishika Kaisha from 10 July 1998. The earliest contractual date for termination was 6 December 2005. The only exception (in clause 33 of the charterparty) for cancellation was if war broke out between Iraq, the United States, the United Kingdom and a number of others. Nippon, nevertheless repudiated the charter on 14 December 2001, redelivering the ship to Golden. Golden accepted this three days after.

They took the case to an arbitrator to consider how much Nippon should pay in damages. By that time, America had started the Iraq War, in March 2003. This was just the event that would have allowed Nippon to cancel the charter, if stayed with it.

The arbitrator, Mr Robert Gaisford, reluctantly decided that the outbreak of war had created a limit on the payable damages. Nippon was liable for no damages after 21 March 2003. Golden appealed, the question being, in what circumstances could a party in breach rely on subsequent events to show that the contractual rights lost were not valuable?

Golden argued that where there was an available market, the loss should be measured at the date of acceptance of breach. It said that this created finality in contractual negotiations, and certainty because events subsequent to the date of acceptance of a contractual breach would become irrelevant.

Judgment
Three members of the House of Lords upheld the decision of the Court of Appeal, while Lord Bingham and Lord Walker dissented.

The majority held that because the outbreak of war occurred before the damages fell to be assessed, they could be taken into account. The most important thing was an accurate assessment of damages based on the loss actually incurred, which goes to the root of the compensatory principles that a victim of breach of contract will be compensated for the loss of his bargain. The victim should be placed in the position as if the contract were performed. The court should not ignore facts that were available. Golden was trying to argue for compensation exceeding the value of what it had lost.

Lord Bingham, dissenting, would have held that damages should be assessed on the date of the breach. That should have meant Golden got damages for four years left on the charterparty. He emphasised the importance of certainty and predictability in English commercial law and said this decision would hurt it.

Lord Walker dissented with Lord Bingham.

Impact and controversy
The decision attracted considerable discussion among jurists and academics, with one former judge of the Commercial Court declaring that it was "‘the worst decision on any aspect of English commercial law, 
and certainly shipping law, that has come out of the House of Lords in my entire career in the legal profession..." Academics have raised several concerns about the majority decision, stating that it damages the certainty which is one of the major advantages of English commercial law, and it encourages the breaching party to delay settlement or prolong litigation. However, it has also been pointed out that the majority decision also reinforces the risk allocation function of contract, and the rule stated in it is both socially desirable and it provides an incentive to inform the other party as early as possible of their intention to breach, thus creating a more efficient outcome from a game theory perspective.

The United Kingdom Supreme Court upheld the principle of The Golden Victory in a unanimous decision in 2015, holding that it applied to one-off contracts, in addition to the instalment contracts that were at issue in the earlier ruling.

See also
In contract
Hong Kong Fir Shipping Co Ltd v Kawasaki Kisen Kaisha [1962] 2 QB 26
Maredelanto Compania Naviera SA v Bergbau-Handel GmbH [1971] 1 QB 164
Bunge Corporation v Tradax SA [1981] 2 All ER 513
L Schuler AG v Wickman Machine Tool Sales Ltd [1974] AC 235
Bunge SA v Nidera BV [2015] UKSC 43

In tort
Baker v Willoughby [1969] 3 All ER 1528

Further reading

Notes

References

External links
  (another case between the parties in the High Court, decided by Morison J)

English remedy case law
English termination case law
House of Lords cases
2007 in case law
2007 in British law